The 1978 Brownlow Medal was the 51st year the award was presented to the player adjudged the fairest and best player during the Victorian Football League (VFL) home and away season. Malcolm Blight of the North Melbourne Football Club won the medal by polling twenty-two votes during the 1978 VFL season.

Leading votegetters 
* The player was ineligible to win the medal due to suspension by the VFL Tribunal during the year.

References 

1978 in Australian rules football
1978